Kołomyja may refer to the following places:
Kolomyia, Ukraine (called Kołomyja in Polish)
Kołomyja, Podlaskie Voivodeship (north-east Poland)